Belmondo is a surname. Notable people with the surname include:

Jean-Paul Belmondo (1933–2021), French actor
His son (born 1963), Paul Belmondo, a racing driver
His father, Paul Belmondo (sculptor)
Stefania Belmondo (born 1969), Italian cross-country skier
Stéphane Belmondo (born 1967), French musician
Vittorio Belmondo (fl. 1930s), Italian racing driver

Italian-language surnames